CFCL-TV was a television station in Timmins, Ontario, Canada. The station was in operation from 1956 to 2002 as a private affiliate of CBC Television.

History
The station was established on June 21, 1956 by J. Conrad Lavigne. It was originally established as a bilingual private affiliate of the Canadian Broadcasting Corporation's English and French television networks. It aired on channel 6.

The station added a rebroadcast transmitter in Kapuskasing in 1957. Lavigne subsequently added rebroadcasters in several communities in Northern Ontario and Western Quebec; by 1965, CFCL had the largest privately owned microwave transmission network in the world. CFCL remained a dual affiliate until the mid-1960s, when CBOFT added a transmitter in Timmins, CBFOT (later becoming CBLFT-3).

In 1971, Lavigne opened new CBC stations in Sudbury (CKNC) and North Bay (CHNB). The existing CBC stations in those cities became CTV affiliates; their owner also extended its Sudbury signal to Timmins via transmitter CKSO-TV-2, later standalone station CITO.

Until 1980, CFCL and CKSO-2 aggressively competed with each other for advertising dollars, leaving both in a precarious financial position due to the Timmins market's relatively small size. In 1980, the Canadian Radio-television and Telecommunications Commission approved the merger of the two stations, along with their co-owned stations in North Bay and Sudbury, into the MCTV twinstick.

In 1990, the MCTV stations were acquired by Baton Broadcasting, which became the sole corporate owner of CTV in 1997.

End of operations
CTV subsequently sold its four CBC affiliates in Northern Ontario, CFCL, CHNB in North Bay, CJIC in Sault Ste. Marie and CKNC in Sudbury directly to the CBC in 2002. All four ceased to exist as separate stations on October 27, 2002, becoming rebroadcasters of Toronto's CBLT, with CFCL's call sign changed to CBLT-7. These translators would close on July 31, 2012, due to budget cuts affecting the CBC.

Transmitters

References

External links
CRTC Decision 2001-457-6, license renewal for all MCTV stations.
 

FCL
FCL
Television channels and stations established in 1956
Television channels and stations disestablished in 2002
1956 establishments in Ontario
2002 disestablishments in Ontario
FCL-TV